Phae Mueang Phi is a place with original rock formations in the Phi Pan Nam Range, Thailand. It is about eight kilometres northeast of Phrae town in Mueang Phrae District, Phrae Province. 

Named after the local ghosts (ผี), the zone of Phae Mueang Phi includes mushroom rocks and distinctive pillars shaped by natural erosive action.

The term Phae Mueang Phi is northern expression meaning 'ghost town grove' because the terrain is otherworldly.

Protected area
Phae Mueang Phi Forest Park is a small protected area covering the site that was established on 8 March 1981. The name "forest park" is a category, for there is no forest as such at the site except for a few scattered trees. The protected zone covers an area of 0.27 km2.

See also
List of rock formations

References

External links

แพะเมืองผี, แพร่
Tourism Thailand - Phrae
Phrae attractions and travel guide, Thailand

Geography of Phrae province
Forest parks of Thailand
Protected areas established in 1981
Erosion landforms
Tourist attractions in Phrae province
Phi Pan Nam Range
Landforms of Thailand